The Mitsubishi Heavy Industries Crystal Mover C810 is an automated people mover train that serves the Sengkang LRT line and Punggol LRT line in Singapore. The trains have been operating since 18 January 2003, with its first service on the Sengkang East Loop, and on 29 January 2005 for the Punggol East Loop.

The C810 was developed and built by Mitsubishi Heavy Industries in cooperation with Crystal Mover Bodywork, the same company that developed the newer Changi Airport Skytrain. The trains were developed for airport and light rail applications. They are fully automated and driverless, relying on Automatic Train Control (ATC) technology.

Singapore's Light Rail Transit purchased 41 C810s to be used on the Sengkang LRT line and Punggol LRT line. From 2013 to 2015, 16 of the 41 existing trains were modified to enable two-car formations to cope with higher demand for the Sengkang and Punggol LRT lines.

Train design

The exterior of the train has a dual-colour colour scheme of dark blue and white. They feature the SBS Transit logo in white. The serial numbers of the trains are marked on the right side of the train at the front and rear. Both the windshield wipers and emergency doors were specially designed for the LRT.

The interior of the Sengkang and Punggol LRT trains feature a red and blue colour scheme. 16 trains that underwent modification have two seats in the front and back converted into perch seats, thus reducing the number of seats to 14 from the usual 18 seats.

As the carriages are closed-end, the train must be stationary and the doors must be open for passengers to move between carriages during 2-car operations.

Train formation
The configuration of a C810 in revenue service is just the one car. With both the motors and the third rail current collectors, the train cars can be coupled up to 2 cars during service.

The car numbers of the trains range from 01 to 41. Individual cars are assigned a two-digit serial number by the rail operator SBS Transit. A trainset consists of one motor car, e.g. set 01 is car 01. Both digits identify the car number.
 Mitsubishi Heavy Industries built sets 01–41.

Operational Issues
On 9 September 2016, SBS Transit as the operator of Sengkang LRT line and Punggol LRT line has announced that 11 of the 41 C810 trains had hairline cracks.

This is barely 2 months after the announcements that the cracks were found in C151A trains which run on both East West MRT line as well as North South MRT line and subsequently C801 trains which run on Bukit Panjang LRT line.

Similar to previous incidents, the joint statement by the SBS Transit and Land Transport Authority said that the cracks were found on the undercarriage of the trains and assure that this does not compromise their ability to bear passenger weight.

SBS Transit has withdrawn affected trains while waiting for the bogie frames found in the undercarriage to be replaced as a precautionary measure. In the report, SBS Transit has said that six of the 11 trains have the issue rectified and resumed their operational duties since while the remaining 5 would be rectified by the middle of next month.

At the same time, the affected bogie frame was sent to Mitsubishi Heavy Industries in Japan for detailed analysis in order to establish the root cause.

The joint statement also said that both LTA and SBS Transit, as well as the manufacturer, will redesign and strengthen the bogie frame structures, which will be applied to all 57 trains including the newer C810A trains. The manufacturer is expected to bear the full cost as well.

Notes

References

Crystal Mover people movers
750 V DC multiple units
Light Rail Transit (Singapore) rolling stock